Jack and Sarah is a 1995 romantic comedy film written and directed by Tim Sullivan and starring Richard E. Grant, Samantha Mathis, Judi Dench, Eileen Atkins, Cherie Lunghi and Ian McKellen.

Plot 
Jack and Sarah are expectant parents, renovating their home for their soon-to-be expanding family. One night, Jack in a panic over getting Sarah to the hospital falls down the stairs and bangs his head. He wakes in hospital to find that Sarah had died after giving birth to their daughter. Grief-stricken, Jack rejects fatherhood, leaving the baby girl in the care of his parents and Sarah's mother.

During this time, Jack relies heavily on drink, and befriends a homeless alcoholic man in a nearby skip. Knowing Jack needs to get back into his life, Jack's father decides to introduce Jack to his daughter by placing the child in bed next him as he sleeps off another all-night bender. The three grandparents then wait in Jack's kitchen until he wakes. Initially overcome by the child and feeling sabotaged, Jack bonds with his daughter. He quickly becomes a doting father as he continues to mourn the loss of his wife. In honour of his wife, Jacks names the child Sarah.

Fatherhood comes naturally to Jack, but he struggles with balancing raising his daughter, house renovation construction, and with his day-time job. In an odd turn of events, the homeless man from the skip comes to visit and Jack offers him work around the house. William, once sober, proves to be a remarkably efficient babysitter and housekeeper. William and Sarah's grandparents are often present to help Jack, Jack realises that he needs is a full-time live-in nanny to care for Sarah. Unfortunately, the interview process finds candidates who are cold or detached or just plain strange, much to Jack and the grandparents' dismay.

In a chance outing at a restaurant with Sarah, Jack encounters the waitress Amy, an American living in London. Amy instantly takes a shine to Sarah and Sarah to her, and Jack offers her the nanny position on the spot. Within the week, Amy moves into Jack and Sarah's house and begins her new job caring for Sarah.

Although Amy clashes with William and the grandparents, especially Jack's mother, Margaret, Jack and Amy gradually grow closer—but Jack's boss has also taken an interest in him.

Cast 
 Richard E. Grant as Jack, the father of Baby Sarah who's taking care of her along with his girlfriend Amy, after the death of his first wife.
 Samantha Mathis as Amy, the American babysitter for Baby Sarah and Jack's new girlfriend.
 Judi Dench as Margaret
 Eileen Atkins as Phil
 Cherie Lunghi as Anna
 Imogen Stubbs as Sarah, the first wife of Jack, who died during the birth of Baby Sarah.
 Ian McKellen as William
 David Swift as Michael
 Bianca Lee and Sophia Lee as Baby Sarah, the daughter of Jack and Sarah.
Sophia Sullivan as Baby Sarah (as a toddler), the daughter of Jack and Sarah.

Production

Development of the film began in 1991 for Granada Film. Polygram joined the film, and shooting began in January 1993.

Release
The film was originally released in the United Kingdom on 9 June 1995.

Reception
The film was the third highest-grossing British film at the UK box office for the year, behind Shallow Grave and The Madness of King George, with a gross of £2,565,673. In the United States and Canada it grossed $218,626.

Music
The theme song in this film is "Stars" by British pop group Simply Red.

References

External links 
 
 
 
 

1995 films
1995 romantic comedy films
British romantic comedy films
French romantic comedy films
Films scored by Simon Boswell
Films shot at Pinewood Studios
PolyGram Filmed Entertainment films
Gramercy Pictures films
1990s English-language films
1990s British films
1990s French films